Gay Abel-Bey is an American film director, producer, writer, editor, and academic. She currently teaches at New York University.

Early life and education 
Abel-Bey earned her B.A. from Mount Holyoke College, as well as her M.F.A. in Film from UCLA. In 1991, she made her thesis film Fragrance, which earned her the Dorothy Arzner Award for "high recognition of dramatic piece by a woman." While in graduate school, Abel-Bey taught courses concerning screenwriting and production for the UCLA School of Theater, Film, and Television. In her time at UCLA, Abel-Bey produced and directed an instructional video concerning television lighting with the Television Lighting Director for ABC, Leslie Zak, as well as an additional lighting seminar for film. She ended up producing three more instructional videos that have been retained at the UCLA archives.

Career 
Abel-Bey ended up being involved in a local film festival called Filmex, as well as co-hosting a retrospective for the National Film School of London. She also helped to develop a community-based documentary workshop for at-risk youth in Los Angeles teenagers via California State, Los Angeles' media department at the time. Additionally, Abel-Bey has produced a variety of other film projects, some of which include Father & Son, Running 4 My Life, When It's Your Turn for WPVI-TV, Stone Cold Hustler, and Kiss Grandmother Goodbye. Father & Son was awarded a Sonny Innovators Award, while Stone Cold Hustler was awarded a local Emmy Award in Washington, D.C. for "Drug Free School Zone" campaign.

In 1995, Abel-Bey started teaching at New York University, and as of 2023, she continues to work there as an Academic Advisor for the Undergraduate Division of Film & Television, teaching courses in production and screenwriting. As a teaching assistant, Abel-Bey taught Remote Television Workshop and Sports Broadcasting & Intermediate Television Production.

Filmography 

Additional works include:

 Father & Son
 Running 4 My Life
 When It's Your Turn
 Stone Cold Hustler
 Kiss Grandmother Goodbye

Awards 

 Dorothy Arzner Award
 Sonny Innovators Award
 Local Emmy Award

References

External links 

American film directors
American women film directors
African-American film directors
L.A. Rebellion
20th-century African-American people
21st-century African-American people
Mount Holyoke College alumni
University of California, Los Angeles alumni
New York University faculty
Living people